Nirmla Wadhwani is a politician from Gujarat and was minister for Women and Child Development in Vijay Rupani's cabinet. She represented Naroda in the Gujarat Legislative Assembly.

Biography
Wadhwani is of Sindhi heritage. She was previously a physician with specialization in Obstetrics and Gynaecology. She had done a diploma in sonography from Croatia and has been the President of Ahmedabad Medical Association's Ladies Wing. She is affiliated to the Bharatiya Janata Party (BJP) and is a member of its executive committee in Gujarat. As a member of the Gujarat Legislative Assembly, she has served on the committees on ICDS, PC-PNDT, Shala Arogya and MLA Quarters. She won the 2012 Gujarat Legislative Assembly election from Naroda. In August 2016, she was appointed Gujarat's Minister for Women and Child Development, the only female member in the cabinet of chief minister Vijay Rupani.

In February 2017 session of the Gujarat Legislative Assembly, a debate on the issue of farmer's suicide turned into a scuffle and Wadhwani was injured. She accused a few MLA's of the Indian National Congress for injuring her arm. The BJP has not included her name in its official list of candidates for 2017 Gujarat Legislative Assembly election.

References

Living people
Indian gynaecologists
Indian obstetricians
Bharatiya Janata Party politicians from Gujarat
Gujarat MLAs 2012–2017
Medical doctors from Gujarat
Women in Gujarat politics
Indian women gynaecologists
1964 births
Sindhi people
21st-century Indian women politicians